Milana Živadinović (born 17 February 1991 in Belgrade, SFR Yugoslavia) is a Serbian professional basketball player. She currently play for Montana 2003 in First League of Bulgaria and Adriatic League. Before Montana 2003 she played for Radivoj Korać, Crvena zvezda, Vojvodina, Mladi Krajišnik, Šumadija Kragujevac, Danzio Timișoara, Kvarner and Partizan.

References

External links
 Profile at eurobasket.com
 Profile at ismbasket.com

1991 births
Living people
Basketball players from Belgrade
Serbian women's basketball players
Serbian expatriate basketball people in Croatia
Serbian expatriate basketball people in Bulgaria
Serbian expatriate basketball people in Bosnia and Herzegovina
Serbian expatriate basketball people in Romania
Point guards
ŽKK Radivoj Korać players
ŽKK Crvena zvezda players
ŽKK Vojvodina players
ŽKK Šumadija Kragujevac players
ŽKK Partizan players